Arleigh may refer to:

Arleigh Burke (1901–1996), admiral of the United States Navy
Arleigh Burke class destroyer
USS Arleigh Burke (DDG-51)
Arleigh McCree (1939–1986),  Officer in Charge of the Firearms and Explosives Unit of the Los Angeles Police Department
Arleigh Winston Scott GCMG, GCVO 1900–1976 Governor-General of Barbados, (1967–1976)